Vasily Borisovich Livanov (born 19 July 1935), MBE, is a Soviet and Russian film actor, animation and film director, screenwriter and writer most famous for portraying Sherlock Holmes in the Soviet TV series. He was named People's Artist of the RSFSR in 1988.

Early years
Vasily Livanov was born into a famous theatrical family. His paternal grandfather Nikolai Aleksandrovich Livanov (1874–1949) was a Volga Cossack from Simbirsk who moved to Moscow in 1905 and performed at the Struysky Theatre under a pseudonym of Izvolsky; after the revolution he worked at the Mossovet and Lenkom Theatres. Vasily's father Boris Livanov (1904–1972) was also a prominent actor and stage director who served at the Moscow Art Theatre all his life, while his mother Eugenia Kazimirovna Livanova (née Prawdzic-Filipowicz) (1907–1978) was an artist who belonged to Polish szlachta.

Vasily was brought up in the artistic milieu. Many famous actors who worked with his father, like Olga Knipper, Alla Tarasova, Vasily Kachalov (whom Livanov was named after), as well as Pyotr Konchalovsky, Boris Pasternak, Valery Chkalov were frequent guests at their house. In 1940 his family was staying in Chernivtsi along with other Moscow actors, and his Polish nanny took him to the local Catholic church where he was baptized, presumably with his mother's permission. Today he belongs to the Russian Orthodox Church despite never officially converting.

His family spent the first war years in evacuation and in 1943 returned to Moscow. In 1954 Vasily graduated from the Moscow Secondary Art School under the USSR Academy of Arts, and in 1958 he finished the acting courses at the Boris Shchukin Theatre Institute. His film career started in 1959 with one of the leading roles in the Letter Never Sent.

The movie was shot in Taiga at −40 °C, and the director Mikhail Kalatozov decided that Livanov and Samoilova should voice their characters crying not in the studio, but outside, right in the woods. As a result, Livanov lost his voice, and in two weeks it returned as a unique hoarse timbre that would become one of Livanov's trademarks ever since.

From 1958 to 1959 he performed at the Vakhtangov Theatre, and from 1960 to 1964 – at the National Film Actors' Theatre. He also starred in the 1960 adaptation of Vladimir Korolenko's Blind Musician along with his father and the 1962 adaptation of Vasily Aksyonov's Colleagues that became his first real breakthrough.

Animation
In 1966 he finished the High Directors Courses where he studied under Mikhail Romm and joined Soyuzmultfilm as an animation director, screenwriter and voice actor. During the next ten years he wrote and directed several animated films, including Most, Most, Most, Most and The Blue Bird feature.

Yet his biggest success came with The Bremen Town Musicians animated musical, a modernised adaptation of the eponymous folktale he created with Yuri Entin and Gennady Gladkov. Both parts showed heavy influence of rock and roll and hippie cultures which was unusual for the Soviet cinema. The first film was directed by Inessa Kovalevskaya, while the sequel On the Trail of the Bremen Town Musicians (1973) was directed by Livanov himself. The leading Soviet pop singer Muslim Magomayev voiced almost all characters in it which only added to the overwhelming popularity of the series (Oleg Anofriyev did the exact same thing in the first film).

Livanov was also the voice behind multiple popular Soviet animated characters such as Gena the Crocodile from the Cheburashka series, Karlsson-on-the-Roof from the Soviet adaptation of Astrid Lindgren's fairy tale and Boa from 38 Parrots.

Sherlock Holmes
In the late 1970s and in the 1980s, Livanov returned to film stardom in what became the greatest success of his acting career: the role of Sherlock Holmes in The Hound of the Baskervilles and other Holmes TV series directed by Igor Maslennikov.

Those movies were filmed between 1979 and 1986, with the latter four stories forming the plot of a standalone big-screen feature entitled The Twentieth Century Approaches. Vasily Livanov played Sherlock Holmes and Vitaly Solomin played Doctor Watson.

On 27 April 2007, a sculpture featuring Sherlock Holmes and Doctor Watson as portrayed by Vasily Livanov and Vitaly Solomin was opened on the Smolenskaya embankment alongside the Embassy of the United Kingdom in Moscow (sculptor Andrey Orlov).

Writer
Apart from screenplays Vasily Livanov has been professionally writing books since the 1960s. He published novels, stories, fairy tales and memoirs, including biography books dedicated to Boris Livanov, Boris Pasternak and other people he personally knew.

Personal life
Livanov was married twice. His first wife (1958–1970) was Alina Engelgardt, daughter of the acclaimed Soviet biochemist Vladimir Engelgardt. They had a daughter Anastasia. Since 1972 he has been married to Elena Artemievna Balabanova, an art director and animator. They have two sons, Boris and Nikolai. In 2009 Boris was charged with a murder of Igor Khromov whom he cut with a knife during a drunken brawl; he was imprisoned for nine years, but set free following a parole in 2015. In June 2017 Maria Golubkina, an actress, daughter of Larisa Golubkina and stepdaughter of Andrei Mironov, announced her engagement to Boris Livanov, but in just a month they "decided to take a break".

Vasily Livanov was a close friend of Vitaly Solomin and Rina Zelyonaya, who played Doctor Watson and Mrs. Hudson. As he writes in his memoir:

"It happens so that when someone passes away, we customarily treat his actions and related events as the thing of the past. But everything about my beloved closest friend and partner Vitaly Solomin has become a part of my way of life, my conscience, so for me it will become the thing of the past only when I pass away too."He's a stout supporter of Vladimir Putin and his policies against Ukraine, supporting both the annexation of Crimea and the 2022 Russian invasion of Ukraine.

Honors and awards
 Honored Artist of the RSFSR (1981)
 People's Artist of the RSFSR (1988)
 Order "For Merit to the Fatherland", 4th class (1 December 2005) — "For substantial contribution to the development of national cinema".
 Honorary Member of the Order of the British Empire (20 February 2006) — "For service to the theatre and performing arts".
 Order of Honour (27 October 2016) — "For great services in the development of national culture and arts, many years of fruitful activity".
 Special Golden Eagle Award (27 January 2017) — "For outstanding contribution to the history of Russian cinema".

Selected filmography

References

External links

  Biography of Vasily Livanov
 The Sherlock Holmes Museum
 Internet site dedicated to Vasiliy Livanov
 A review of the Sherlock Holmes series

 The adventures of Sherlock Holmes in Russia
 221b.ru - Russian site dedicated to Vasiliy Livanov

1935 births
20th-century Russian male actors
20th-century Russian male writers
20th-century Russian screenwriters
21st-century Russian male actors
21st-century Russian male writers
21st-century Russian screenwriters
Living people
Male actors from Moscow
Academicians of the National Academy of Motion Picture Arts and Sciences of Russia
High Courses for Scriptwriters and Film Directors alumni
Honorary Members of the Order of the British Empire
Honored Artists of the RSFSR
People's Artists of the RSFSR
Recipients of the Order "For Merit to the Fatherland", 4th class
Recipients of the Order of Honour (Russia)
Male screenwriters
Russian people of Polish descent
Audiobook narrators
Russian animated film directors
Russian animators
Russian children's writers
Russian film directors
Russian male film actors
Russian male novelists
Russian male short story writers
Russian male voice actors
Russian memoirists
Russian screenwriters
Soviet animation directors
Soviet animators
Soviet children's writers
Soviet male film actors
Soviet male voice actors
Soviet memoirists
Soviet novelists
Soviet screenwriters
Soviet short story writers
Anti-Ukrainian sentiment in Russia